Paul Hastings Allen (28 November 1883 in Boston, Massachusetts – 28 September 1952 in Boston, Massachusetts) was an American composer.

Life
He was born in Hyde Park, a neighborhood of Boston, After being graduated from Harvard College (A. B., 1903), he went to Florence, Italy, where he studied composition with Antonio Scontrino and piano with Giuseppe Buonamici. During World War I, he served in the U.S. diplomatic service. After returning to Boston in 1920, he remained for the rest of his life. He was a prolific composer of operas, symphonies, chamber, and vocal music. He wrote an opera based on The Last of the Mohicans by James Fenimore Cooper. He was awarded a Paderewski Prize for his symphony entitled Pilgrim. Though dated 1909, the prize was awarded in January 1910. Many of his works are in the library at Harvard University.

Works

Operas  
 The Monastery (1911)
 It filtro (Genoa, October 26, 1912)
 Milda (Venice, June 14, 1913)
 L'ultimo dei Mohicani (Florence, February 24, 1916)
 Cleopatra (1921)
 La piccolo Figaro (1931)
 I fiori
 The Amaranths

Symphonies
 Symphony No. 1 in G, Al Mare
 Symphony No. 2 in C, Cosmopolitan
 Symphony No. 3 in E, Liberty
 Symphony No. 4 in A, Lyra
 Symphony No. 5 in E, Phoebus
 Symphony No. 6 in D, Pilgrim (received the Paderewski Prize, 1909)
 Symphony No. 7 in E-flat, Somerset
 Symphony No. 8 in D, Utopia.

References

External links 
Paul Hastings Allen manuscript scores, published scores, and other material, 1900-1952 at Isham Memorial Library, Harvard University

1883 births
1952 deaths
American male composers
American classical composers
Harvard College alumni
People from Hyde Park, Boston
20th-century American male musicians